Leif Erikson are a British indie band based in London. Their debut record Leif Erikson was released in August 2017. The group have been reviewed in publications including Stereogum, Clash and Line of Best Fit.

History 
Leif Erikson started out in 2015, after members of the band Flashguns reunited. Their debut record Leif Erikson was released by Arts & Crafts in the United States and Canada and self released elsewhere.

References

Musical groups from London
English indie rock groups